Calisto franciscoi is a butterfly of the family Nymphalidae. It is endemic to parts of Hispaniola, where it is found in the lowland desert.

The larvae feed on various species of Brunch grass.

References

Butterflies described in 1985
Calisto (butterfly)